Jane Harry Thresher called Jane Harry and Jenny Harry (1755–1784), Kingston, Jamaica, was an abolitionist, Quaker, and artist. She fought for the release of slaves owned by her family and the right to equal inheritance. She was born to Thomas Hibbert and Charity Harry. Her father had travelled from England to Jamaica where he bought several properties and later became a judge. Her mother was a free woman but was employed as the housekeeper of Hibbert. Although sexual relations between staff and the wealthy were common in Jamaica, there is no existing evidence suggesting that this union was consensual.

Early life and family
Harry was born the same year that her father built Hibbert House, which was used as a centre for the work of Hibbert. Hibbert and his business partners, Samuel Jackson and Nathaniel Spriggs, acted as factors for incoming slave ships coming from Africa, purchasing and reselling over 16,000 slaves for a profit in the hundreds of thousands.

It was a common practice to send children, especially mixed children from the colonies, to England to provide education for them. This was not an expression of generosity, but was instead intended to have them “avoid acquiring the vulgar manners of Negro domestics.” Harry was sent to England with her 4-year-old sister, Margaret, at the age of 13. Harry lived under the stewardship of the previous business partner of her father and slave trader Nathaniel Spriggs, who held a very well-established academic company in his circle, while her sister was sent to boarding school.

Education 
When in England, Harry studied art under the tutelage of Sir Joshua Reynolds, a famed portrait artist and one of the intellectuals that travelled in the circles of the peers of Harry's father, Nathaniel Spriggs. Mixed race women travelling from outside England to gain access to education were often considered to be White, as they were raised with similar religious and social ideals of Anglo-Saxon society. Access to education altogether, in particular artistic training, was widely only accessible to mixed race women, who had been acknowledged by a wealthy parent who had paid for their journey, meaning Harry had a certain degree of privilege in her ability to travel abroad. It can be assumed, by her teacher and the typical work of Black women of the period, that Harry's art was portraiture. Prestigious academies typically only allowed women to partake in them on the condition that they had mastered a degree of historical painting, which required study of the nude, which women were not permitted to do. Because of this, many women instead made portrait art, and Black women in particular used it as a tool of record-keeping.

Harry won an award for her artwork in 1778, receiving a gold medal from the Society for the Encouragement of the Arts, Manufacturing, and Commerce, based in London. Unfortunately, no work credited to Harry survives, though there is likely some in existence that has not been assigned to her person.

Quakerism 
Harry converted to the religious pursuit of Quakerism following the death of her young sister, Margaret, while she was at boarding school. After her sister's death, she found solace in a woman she met through Sprigg's intellectual social circle, Mary Morris Knowles. Quakers were some of the first to pursue the goal of the abolition of slavery, as they saw no difference in the soul of Black slaves or White high-society figures. Thus within Quakerism, Harry pursued what the modern era would define as feminist studies and pursuits. Many Quaker women, as Knowles enacted the Quaker right to refuse marriage (on more than one occasion in fact), and did not dress in styles typical to the social environment of the time, were considered to be queer activists as well.

Quakerism was a diversion from typical religious pursuits of the period. This was a non-issue for Harry, though it was used as a scapegoat in her social circles, when she lost several acquaintances for her religious ideologies. With this religious rejection came racist rhetoric against Harry herself, and she was eventually rejected by her non-Quaker associates, who believed that she should have remained aligned with the religious teachings encouraged and provided by her wealthy father. Particularly by her colleague in her social circles, Samuel Johnson.

Hibbert himself did not approve of her religious change and refused to financially support her, even after she wrote a 28-page letter detailing the events that had occurred in England leading her to choose Quakerism, and how the event of her sister's death had caused her to lose faith in the religious instruction of the Catholic Church. Her benefactor, Nathaniel Spriggs, informed her that she was no longer welcome to reside with him under his care following her change of religious pursuit. Harry instead found her own financial support and acquired a job working for the wealthy Quaker Sampson Lloyd as a governess for his fifteen children, and living with her friend Knowles. This was a job uncommon to be entrusted to a young Black woman, as she is their teacher, not just a caretaker. The Lloyd family was a generous beneficiary and supporter of the abolition movement, focusing their efforts on Jamaica from their home in England.

Activism 
Harry's alignment with Quakerism, as well as the intersection of her race and gender, seem to be two indications and encouragers towards her life as an activist and abolitionist. Her experiences with racism in England encouraged her involvement with the abolitionist movement. Her most notable efforts in abolition came after her father's death in the year 1780. Harry was left a small portion of his estate, £2000, while her male relative, Thomas Hibbert Jr, was left £100,000.

She immediately addressed a bid to gain the same inheritance and was refused, as Thomas claimed she was illegitimate and not accepted by her father, despite the 28-page affectionate letter addressed to him only several years prior. Her mother Charity was given £1000, a small property, and all of the slaves that had been in Hibbert's possession. Harry wrote to her mother expressing a desire to free the slaves owned by her mother and teach them in the religious instruction of Quakerism.

Harry resolved to free these slaves as she had studied ethics only a year earlier. Further, Quakerism at this period held a clear stance for the abolition of slavery. There was a known extension of Christian Liberty to include a concept of Human Liberty, and Quakers had lobbied on several occasions to outwardly abolish slavery. Harry's efforts were thwarted by a hurricane in Jamaica, and the war between the colonies and England preventing safe sea travel.

Harry, and the rest of the Quakers, predated the mass organized movement abolishing slavery in England in the late 18th-century. At the time her Quaker circle supported her travel, as did Dr. Joseph Thresher, the Quaker surgeon that Harry married at the time.

Marriage and death 
Jane Harry married Joseph Thresher in 1782 at a Quaker House in London, with Mary Knowles acting as a witness of their union. Their marriage certificate is one of only two preserved documents of its type from the 18th-century, that being a union between a Black woman and a White man. Two years after their marriage, Harry gave birth to their first and only child, whose records are lost and died shortly after herself. After this birth, she lay ill and died at the age of 28. Due to the international conflict between America and England, Harry was never able to complete her goal of returning home to free her mother's slaves and teach them in the practices of Quakerism. Instead, Harry left in her obituary, which appears in the Gentleman's Magazine 1784 addition, her final desire to free the slaves owned by her mother. It reads: "she has requested her husband that, if the said Negroes be liberated at her mother's death, he will pay the premium to the Island, for such liberation, if any should be required." Jane Harry was identified as an abolitionist in this obituary  three years before a national board of abolition was formed in Europe.

References

1784 deaths
1755 births
Quakers
Quaker abolitionists